LUMC may refer to:
 Leiden University Medical Center, a hospital in the Netherlands
 Loyola University Medical Center, a hospital in the USA